Hanks is a surname of English, or Dutch origin, meaning "son of Hankin" and may refer to:
 Boo Hanks (1928–2016), American Piedmont blues guitarist and singer
 Carol Hanks Aucamp (born 1943), American tennis player 
 Colin Hanks (born 1977), American actor
 Craig Hanks (born 1961), American philosopher
 Ephraim Hanks (1826–1896), prominent member of the 19th-century Latter Day Saint movement
 Ernest Hanks (1888–1965), English footballer
 Fletcher Hanks (1889–1976), cartoonist
 Henry Garber Hanks (1826–1907), American mineralogist
 James M. Hanks (1833–1909), member of the United States House of Representatives
 Jim Hanks (born 1961), American voice-over artist and character actor
 Kerri Hanks (born 1985), American soccer player
 Larry Hanks (born 1953), American entomologist
 Lena Tracy Hanks (1879–1944), American botanist
 Merton Hanks (born 1968), American former National Football League safety
 Mike Hanks (born 1952 or 1953), American college basketball coach
 Nancy Lincoln (1784–1818), maiden name Hanks, mother of Abraham Lincoln
 Nancy Hanks (art historian) (1927–1983), second chairman of the National Endowment for the Arts
 Patrick Hanks (born 1940), English lexicographer and corpus linguist
 Robert Lowery Hanks (1913–1971), American actor better known as Robert Lowery
 Ron Hanks, American politician
 Sam Hanks (1914–1994), American race car driver
 Terrill Hanks (born 1995), American football player
 Thomas C. Hanks, American seismologist
 Tom Hanks (born 1956), American film actor
 William Hanks (born 1952), American anthropologist and linguist

See also
 Hank (disambiguation)

Surnames from given names